Flavell may refer to: 

 Bobby Flavell, English footballer
 Bobby Flavell, Scottish footballer
 Edwin Flavell (British soldier)
 Jack Flavell
 John H. Flavell
 Kirsty Flavell
 Te Ururoa Flavell
 Troy Flavell

See also
 Flyford Flavell